Anomocala is a monotypic moth genus of the family Noctuidae. Its only species, Anomocala hopkinsi, is known from Samoa. Both the genus and the species were first described by Tams in 1935.

References

Catocalinae
Noctuoidea genera
Monotypic moth genera